Alakbar Mammadov (9 May 1930 – 28 July 2014) was a Soviet and Azerbaijani footballer best known as a striker for FC Dynamo Moscow in the 1950s and later as the first manager of the independent Azerbaijan national football team.

He has been classified as a Master of Sport of the USSR as a four-time champion player in the Soviet Top League and a member of the Soviet national team. Mammadov also played for and managed his hometown club Neftçi PFK for a total of 12 years.

He was only player to score four goals against AC Milan at San Siro.

Career
Mammadov was well known for scoring the winning goal for Dynamo to clinch the Soviet Top League title for the club in the 87th minute of their 1957 championship match against Spartak Moscow; 50 years later, Mammadov's strike was commemorated when he was awarded the Order of Alexander Nevsky (first degree) at Dynamo's Petrovsky Park. In addition to the 45 goals he scored as a member of Dynamo in league play, Mammadov also scored 11 times in international club play, including equalizers against A.C. Milan in front of 100,000 spectators at San Siro in 1955 and against the Brazilian side Vasco da Gama during their 1956 friendly in Moscow in front of 90,000 fans.

Between 1972 and 1990, Mammadov was the President of the staff that organized the "Leather Ball" All-Soviet Youth Football Tournament (Всероссийский турнир юных футболистов «Кожаный мяч»), which now is associated with the Danone Nations Cup. Mammadov wrote a memoir titled Secrets of the Football Profession in 1991.

In 1992, Mammadov became the first head coach of the Azerbaijani national football team, compiling a 3–1 record as coach that includes the first ever national team victory, over Georgia, on 25 May 1993. For his contributions to Azerbaijani football, a football tournament was established in 2008 in Mammadov's honor, which was played in Baku.

Honours
Dynamo Moscow
Soviet Top League: 1954, 1955, 1957, 1959
Soviet Top League runner-up: 1956, 1958
Soviet Cup runner-up: 1955

Individual
Best 33 players of the Soviet Top League season: No. 3 - 1956, 1957
Order of the Badge of Honour
Shohrat Order 
Order of Alexander Nevsky (first degree)

References

External links

Player stats on KLISF
RussianTeam.ru: We Must Draw on the

1930 births
2014 deaths
Footballers from Baku
Azerbaijani footballers
Soviet Top League players
FC Dynamo Moscow players
Soviet footballers
Soviet football managers
Soviet Union international footballers
Neftçi PFK managers
Honoured Masters of Sport of the USSR
Azerbaijani football managers
Azerbaijan national football team managers
Soviet Azerbaijani people
Association football forwards
Neftçi PFK players
Burials at II Alley of Honor